Haymount is an unincorporated community in Caroline County, in the U.S. state of Virginia.

References

Unincorporated communities in Virginia
Unincorporated communities in Caroline County, Virginia